Tom Nicholls is a former professional Australian rules footballer who plays for the Gold Coast Football Club in the Australian Football League (AFL). He was one of the club's underage recruits, and played in the Gold Coast's first season. Nicholls made his debut in Round 8 of the 2011 AFL season, against . During that game he played against his girlfriend's brother, Kurt Tippett.

Early life
Nicholls was born in Yarrawonga in country Victoria to a Fijian mother and an Australian father. He completed his high school studies at St Bede's College (Mentone) and St Kevin's College in Melbourne.

Junior football
Nicholls attended St Kevin's College in Toorak and began playing his junior football for the Cheltenham Junior Football Club in Melbourne. He later moved to the Sandringham Dragons in the TAC Cup for the 2009 season. At the completion of the 2009 season, Nicholls signed for the newly formed GC17 team that would compete in the VFL for the 2010 season.

AFL career
Nicholls made his AFL debut for the Gold Coast Suns against the Adelaide Crows in Round 8 of the 2011 AFL season. A knee injury kept him out of the team for the rest of the 2011 season.

Nicholls was the Round 16 nomination for the 2013 AFL Rising Star award.

He was selected as the ruckman in the AFL Players' Association's inaugural 22under22 team.

References

External links

1992 births
Living people
Gold Coast Football Club players
Australian rules footballers from Victoria (Australia)
Australian people of I-Taukei Fijian descent
Sandringham Dragons players
People from Victoria (Australia)
People educated at St Kevin's College, Melbourne